Rui Manuel Parente Chancerelle de Machete (born 7 April 1940) is a Portuguese politician. Machete served as Minister of Social Affairs from 1976 to 1979, Minister of Justice from 1983 to 1985, Deputy Prime Minister and Minister of National Defense in 1985, and Minister of State and Foreign Affairs from 2013 to 2015. He was the leader of the Social Democratic Party in 1985.

References

1940 births
Living people
Government ministers of Portugal
Foreign ministers of Portugal
Justice ministers of Portugal
Ministers of National Defence of Portugal
Social Democratic Party (Portugal) politicians
People from Setúbal